is a Japanese rock band, signed to Victor Entertainment. Their multi-genre sound has been described as such things as "a spaceship of rock" and "spacey dance rock."

Biography 

The band members were all classmates at a high school in Kanagawa. They formed the band in 2002, debuting as an independent artist under K-Plan in 2004 with the extended play Science Rock, followed by their debut album Avenger Strikes Back in 2006.

In 2007, the band played at the rookie stage in the Fuji Rock summer festival, and toured with The Band Apart. In 2008, the band released their second album, Science Rock, and toured the United States as part of Japan Nite.

The band collaborated with Kaela Kimura, producing her 2009 single "Banzai." They also contributed to a Disney song cover compilation album, Disney Rocks!, covering "Mickey Mouse March." 2009 also saw tours with bands The Hiatus and Nothing's Carved in Stone, and for the band to release their first release with a major label, Victor Entertainment, with their second EP Jupiter Jupiter. The band were subsequently picked as one of the iTunes Japan "Sound of 2010" break-through artists.

In 2010, the band released their third album, Dynamo, led by the single "Delight Slight Lightspeed," which debuted at #20 on Oricon's daily singles charts.

Discography

Original albums

Compilation albums

Extended plays

Live album

Singles

References

External links 
 Avengers in Sci-Fi official site 
 
 Taro Kohata's blog 

2002 establishments in Japan
Japanese rock music groups
Musical groups established in 2002
Japanese musical trios
Musical groups from Kanagawa Prefecture
Space rock musical groups
Victor Entertainment artists